Bloody Angle may refer to:

 The Bloody Angle (Gettysburg), in the American Civil War, an area of the Gettysburg, PA battlefield (1863)
 The Bloody Angle (Spotsylvania), an American Civil War engagement at the Battle of Spotsylvania Court House (1864)
 The Bloody Angle (battle), a skirmish during the British retreat from the Battles of Lexington and Concord of the American Revolution (1775)
 "The Bloody Angle", a section of Doyers Street (Manhattan) in New York City's Chinatown

See also
Angle (disambiguation)